Nathan Joseph Mendes (born 2 June 2001), mononymously known by his stage name Tsumyoki (pronounced sue-ma-yoki), or simply as Yoki, is an Indian rapper, singer, audio engineer, songwriter, record producer and one of the leading artists from Goa. He gained popularity from his single track release, "White Tee" (2019), "Daboij" album (2021), maiden EP release, "Way Too Messy" (2021), featuring fellow Goan rapper, Kidd Mange and "Pink Blue" (2022), featuring Bharg. His stage name defines "vision, productivity and a positive mindset".

Mendes is also credited for revolutionizing the English genre of Hip hop music in the Indian coastal state of Goa. He is the first Goan music artist and the youngest member at age 19, to be signed by DIVINE's record label, Gully Gang Records in 2021. He was also featured in Goan Insider’s 50 Most Influential People of 2021 and has been described by 'It'sGoa.com' as Goa's best rapper.

Early and personal life
Nathan Joseph Mendes was born on 2 June 2001 in Goa to Gianna Mendes and hails from Margao. He has a sister. His grandfather, Joe was a musician who died in September 2018. Mendes completed his Higher Secondary School Certificate from The King's School at Sao Jose de Areal. He later graduated with a Bachelor of Arts degree from St. Xavier's College at Mapusa.

Career

2018–2019: Early beginnings
Mendes started his career as a musician during his teen years, at the age of 17, his initial goal was to diversify his genres, not only to focus on rap. He acknowledges his mother as a big support, along with his family behind his music career and considers artists like XXXTENTACION, Juice WRLD, Drake, Eminem, Post Malone, Ski Mask the Slump God and Michael Jackson as his role models. Mendes also recalls in an interview, of how he started his career with only  and barely could afford technical instruments. He had to depend on his mother as he needed more money to kickstart his music journey with proper equipments, he then performed for her to which she was convinced.

Mendes first began doing music as a hobby in 11th grade. He mentions that breaking into the rap game wasn't easy and often would wait outside the clubs holding a USB of his tracks inorder to get recognised by bigger artists. Further speaking he also states that hardly supported local artists with original music from Goa and had to grind his way into getting recognised.

2019–present: Rise to success
Mendes's breakthrough came from his single track release, "White Tee" in 2019. The idea behind the track was a hook, "White Tee, Bish get off”, he always had in mind, to which he added the beats and tunes. The music video was mainly shot in Fatorda and other locations, participated by many of his followers. Mendes further stated in an interview that, "White Tee" signifies a mindset, for example if you're wearing something white, you ought to not get dirty. Similarly it means you don't need people's negativity affecting your perspective.

In October 2019, Mendes had plans on releasing the music video, "Save Me", which saw no light later. The origin of his stage name, "Tsumyoki" came, when he woke up on a regular day and looked himself in the mirror, it has a Japanese influence. Initially in the beginning of his career, Mendes was abashed about the stage name, it was only after gaining popularity he felt comfortable. He has also stated that he is immensely influenced by the American culture and is working on bringing out Indian culture as well in his music.

At age 18, Mendes started performing at clubs and has also judged several college events. One of his first two gigs was with DJ Skeletron. Mendes and the latter collaborated in the single track "Go Hard" which was released on 4 August 2019, following the success of "Go Hard", 'Showbar', a gastropub in Candolim offered him his first show.

In November 2020, Mendes produced "Ketta", a single track by Carisio Azavedo mononymously known as Bongisio, a Merces based music artist which was mastered and recorded by 2jaym. Prior to his entry in the music field, he had no Goan rappers as an influence as there were no prominent artists back then. He has collaborated with music artists, producers and influencers like JD, 2Jaym, Elttwo, ZaDaRapper and ZB Memes.

On 4 September 2021, Mendes released his 15-minute maiden EP, "Way Too Messy", it included five tracks with themes of cancel culture, ambition and self discovery. The inspiration behind it was when he and Daniel Sequeira professionally known as Kidd Mange, were invited to the Gully Gang camp, wherein they were involved in making music. That's when they decided to make the EP which the Gully Gang team loved and finished three songs in two days and the remaining two were added later.

Mendes has also produced and performed in "Goa Rap Cypher" which featured nine local artists, wherein they voiced out on crises like the "Mollem situation", Goa is facing.

Goa Trap Culture
Mendes is one of the founding members of the boy band, Goa Trap Culture also known as the GTC crew. The band members include local Goan music artists, Elttwo, 2jaym, and Kidd Mange. They're best known for their 2021 album "Daboij", the album included a variation of genres like pop, rock, indie, R&B/soul, hip-hop, rap and trap music. It also featured other artists like Vash, Yelhomie and production from CapsCtrl on some of their beats.

Some of the popular tracks of the album were "Jackets" and "Flex Bomb" which were also the personal favorites of the crew, saw influence of the diverse music genres like pop/emotional and rap/hip-hop. The crew stated in an interview with 'Goan Insider' that the inspiration behind the album's name was friendship that they had. 'Daboij' simply means 'The Boys'. The initial work on the album started prior to the COVID-19 pandemic and took about a year to be completed.

The band further stated that XXXTentacion, Tyler, the Creator, MF Doom, Anson Seabra, J. Cole, Juice Wrld, Lauv and Nucleya were some of their inspirations for each of their tracks, Nucleya also advised them on their vocals approach. One of their single from the album, "Sorpotel", a Goan inspired remake that was written by Mendes's grandfather who passed away in 2018 and never got recognition for it. They also further plan to collaborate with Oliver Tree, Ritviz and Divine in the near future.

In the media
In October 2020, Mendes supported a peaceful protest of rape awareness at Ravindra Bhavan in Margao. The protest was started by a 15-year-old, Sheniah Menezes with the help of her parents and participated by over 50 people.

Discography

Albums

EPs

Singles and collaborations

References

External links
 
 

2001 births
Indian rappers
Goan people
Indian hip hop musicians
Living people
Singers from Goa
21st-century rappers
21st-century Indian musicians
People from South Goa district
Indian male singers
Indian audio engineers
People from Margao
Indian male singer-songwriters
21st-century Indian male musicians